List of tramways in Queensland provides three separate lists, each in alphabetical order of the key identifier. They are:
 Non sugar cane tramways, ordered by Tramway Name as contained in Wikipedia articles.
 Sugar cane tramways, ordered by Sugar Mill Name, of which not all mills have a Wikipedia article.
 Miscellaneous tramways for which only limited information is available, ordered by Enterprise Name as contained in Wikipedia articles

This list article does not include the Brisbane tramway network, the Brisbane Tramway Museum, the Gold Coast light rail, or the Rockhampton steam tram network.

The information listed is derived from the references and from the wikilinked articles (including those in “See also”)

Non sugar cane tramways
They were regarded as tramways because of their lighter construction, and because they did not compete with government railways. The Mapleton Tramway, a former sugar cane tramway, is included in this list because it has its own article, and is heritage listed.

Tramway lengths are shown in miles to conform to other Australian railway articles. Where the source shows the distance in kilometres some small difference may occur due to rounding.

Sugar cane tramways
None of these tramways have their own article, but some of the mills have articles in which the associated tramway network is mentioned. Most of the locality articles contain some information about the associated sugar mill/s.

Shared sugar cane tramways
The following mills, through common ownership arrangements, share their tramway networks:
 Farleigh, Marian, Pleystowe and Racecourse;
 Macknade and Victoria;
 Babinda, Mourilyan and South Johnstone;
 Invicta and Kalamia (via a dual gauge track over the  Pioneer line)

Other early tramways
This list shows early enterprises that had some form of tramway, of which little is known.

See also

 Rail tramways In Queensland
 List of sugar mills in Queensland
 2 ft gauge railways in Australia
 Tramway (industrial)
 Mackay Railway

References

Sugar mills in Queensland
Queensland-related lists
2 ft gauge railways in Australia
Narrow gauge railways in Australia